Timothy Bedah (October 4, 1945 – June 18, 2017) was a Navajo American painter and goldsmith born in Tohatchi, New Mexico. He exhibited his work across the United States. Bedah is known for his silver and gold jewelry, including rings, bracelets, and buckles, for which he won a number of awards.

Bedah was born to Edward Bedah (Plains Indian, Kiiyanii clan) and Thelma Begay (Navajo, Todacheenie clan). He was a promising art student as a child, excelling in painting and music. After graduating from Gallup High School in 1965, he was a guitarist and drummer in a country music band.

He worked for a time at Carson's Trading Post in Gallup, New Mexico, where he learned how to silversmith. In the mid-1970s he began working with gold.

Bedah died in 2017 in Albuquerque, New Mexico. He is buried in the Tohatchi Cemetery.

References 

20th-century American painters
20th-century indigenous painters of the Americas
Native American painters
Navajo artists
Painters from New Mexico
1945 births
2017 deaths
20th-century Native Americans
21st-century Native Americans
Native American jewelers
American goldsmiths
American silversmiths